The 2016 Nevada Wolf Pack football team represented the University of Nevada, Reno in the 2016 NCAA Division I FBS football season. The Wolf Pack were led by fourth–year head coach Brian Polian and played their home games at Mackay Stadium. They were members of the West Division of the Mountain West Conference. They finished the season 5–7 and 3–5 in Mountain West play to finish in a three–way tie for third place in the West Division.

On November 27, Polian and Nevada agreed to part ways. He finished at Nevada with a four year record of 23–27. Polian later returned to the Notre Dame Fighting Irish football as special teams coordinator under head coach Brian Kelly after previously serving under head coach Charlie Weis from 2005 to 2009.

Preseason

Mountain West media days
The Mountain West media days were held on July 26–27, 2016, at the Cosmopolitan in Paradise, Nevada.

Media poll
The preseason poll was released on July 26, 2016. The Wolf Pack were predicted to finish in second place in the MW West Division.

Preseason All–Mountain West Team
The Wolf Pack had one player selected to the preseason All–Mountain West Team; one from the defense.

Defense

Dameon Baber – DB

Schedule

Personnel

Game summaries

Cal Poly

at Notre Dame

Buffalo

at Purdue

at Hawaii

Fresno State

at San Jose State

Wyoming

at New Mexico

San Diego State

Utah State

at UNLV

References

Nevada
Nevada Wolf Pack football seasons
Nevada Wolf Pack football